Maj Toure (born Martin Anthony Jones) is an American libertarian political activist and rapper. Toure is closely associated with the Mises Caucus wing of the American Libertarian Party.

A native of North Philadelphia, Toure founded the educational nonprofit organization Black Guns Matter in 2016. The organization advocates for the right to keep and bear arms, and promotes responsible ownership of firearms within African-American and urban communities.

He has released three rap/hip hop recordings: Solutionary Vol. 1 (2005), Solutionary Vol. 2 (2014), and Solutionary Vol. 3 (2016). 

Toure was a candidate for an at-large seat in the Philadelphia City Council in the city's 2019 election. He ran as a Libertarian. In addition to his support for Second Amendment rights, his stated political priorities included: criminal justice reform; ending the practice of solitary confinement; legalization of cannabis; improved education in Philadelphia; and conflict resolution training for disconnected youths. On November 5, 2019, Toure finished 15th in a field of 17 candidates in the city's election, failing to secure a seat on the City Council.  He received 5,676 votes (0.5% of the vote total).

Toure spoke at the Conservative Political Action Conference (CPAC) in February 2019.

In a dialogue with Lawrence B. Jones in 2021, Toure applauded grassroots anti-racist protestors for emphasizing that black lives do in fact matter, while denouncing Black Lives Matter, Inc. as a "money laundering operation" that "fleeces the black community," with the goal of aiding Democratic politicians.

Electoral history

References

External links
Maj Toure's City Council official campaign site 

Year of birth missing (living people)
Living people
African-American activists
21st-century American rappers
Activists from Philadelphia
African-American male rappers
American cannabis activists
American gun rights activists
American libertarians
 Critics of Black Lives Matter
Pennsylvania Libertarians
Rappers from Philadelphia